Lovelock! is the second album by  Gene Page.  It was produced by Billy Page.

Track listing
"Wild Cherry" (Billy Page, Ray Parker Jr.)   	 3:52   	
"Organ Grinder" (Billy Page, Gene Page)	4:37 	
"Higher, My Love" (Billy Page, Gene Page)	4:30 	
"Together - Whatever" (Gene Page, Louis Johnson, Melvin Ragin, Rasputin Bantte)	3:40 	
"Fantasy Woman"  (Billy Page, Gene Page)	4:16 	
"Into My Thing" (Gene Page)	3:59 	
"Straw in the Mind" (Billy Page) 	3:59 	
"Escape to Disco" (Gene Page)	3:46

References

Ed Greene - drums
Wilton Felder - bass
Henry Davis - bass
Ray Parker Jr. - guitar
Dean Parks - guitar
Melvin Wah Wah Watson - guitar
Lee Ritenour - guitar
David T. Walker - guitar
Joe Sample - piano
Gene Page - keyboards
Tom Hensley - keyboards
Reginald Sonny Burke - keyboards
Michel Rubini - keyboards
Clark Spangler - Arp programmer
Gary Coleman - percussion
Bobbye Hall - congas
Ernie Watts - tenor & alto saxophone solos
George Bohanon - trombone solos
Oscar Brashear - trumpet solos 
Plas Johnson - tenor saxophone solos 
Jim Horn - flute solos
Tom Scott - flute, tenor & alto saxophone solos
Harry Bluestone - concertmaster
Merry Clayton - vocals
Jim Gilstrap - vocals
Augie Johnson - vocals
Carolyn Willis - vocals
John Lehman - vocals
Louis Patton - vocals
Gregory Matta - vocals
Edna Wright - vocals
Technical
David Hassinger - Engineer
Jim Nipar - Assistant Engineer
Sound Factory, Hollywood, California
Gene Page & Billy Page - Producers

External links
 Gene Page-Lovelock! at Discogs

1976 albums
Gene Page albums
Albums arranged by Gene Page
Atlantic Records albums